Nowrin Hasan Chamok (Bengali: নওরিন হাসান চমক), commonly known as Chamok Hasan, is an author, musician, online educator and engineer from Bangladesh. As of 2022, he authored 6 books on mathematics and popular science in Bengali.  Chamok debuted as a music director in the 2022 Indian Bengali-language drama film Baba Baby O.

Works

Books 

 Golpe-jolpe Genetics গল্পে-জল্পে জেনেটিক্স (2012)
 Goniter Ronge: Hashikhushi Gonit গণিতের রঙ্গে: হাসিখুশি গণিত (2015)
 Onko Bhaia অঙ্ক ভাইয়া (2018)
 Nimikh Pane: Calculus er Poth Poribhrmon, Parts 1 & 2 নিমিখ পানে: ক্যালকুলাসের পথ পরিভ্রমণ (2019)
 Juktifande Foring যুক্তিফাঁদে ফড়িং (2021)
"Nibir gonit নিবীড় গণিত"(2022)

Personal life

Chamok holds a PhD in electrical engineering and works at Boston Scientific Corporation in California, United States as a research and development engineer.  He is married to Feroza Binte Omar and the couple has two children. Chamok mentioned Feroza as a song-writing partner.

References 

Living people
1986 births
Bangladeshi male musicians
Bangladesh University of Engineering and Technology alumni